Municipalities and county councils in Sweden may form local federations and transfer to such federations the management of local government concerns. When a local federation attends to a matter for which provisions exist in a special enactment, the provisions of that enactment concerning municipalities or county councils shall apply to the local federation.

A local federation shall have as a decision-making body a federation assembly or a federation directorate. Members and alternates of the decision-making assembly are elected, as indicated in the federation statutes, by the assemblies of the federation members.

See also
 County councils of Sweden
 Municipalities of Sweden
 Mancomunidad, a similar construction in Spain
 Joint powers authority, a similar construction in the United States, especially California

References 

Local government in Sweden
Forms of local government